Thiotrichinae is a subfamily of moths in the family Gelechiidae.

Genera
Macrenches Meyrick, 1904
Palumbina Rondani, 1876
Polyhymno Chambers, 1874
Thiotricha Meyrick, 1886

References

Thiotrichinae at funet

 
Gelechiidae